The , also known as the peacock tail goldfish, is a breed of wakin-like goldfish developed in Japan.

Description
Jikins have the body shape of a wakin or a ryukin (somewhat) but with a compressed, wide-angled tail that looks like the letter X when viewed from behind.

Despite other ubiquitous color variations (from red, white, and orange), jikin also have a desired pattern called rokurin, or 'Twelve Points of Red' (TPoR). Rokurin is a type of pattern commonly displayed in jikins because in Japan, the fish are often applied in the process by scraping off the red areas of the scales and face of young individuals. This practice however isn't used elsewhere. Jikin offspring may produce TPoR naturally to reduce that practice.

The rokurin pattern has red point/s displayed at the following parts:

 Lip
 Caudal fin (pair)
 Dorsal fin
 Pelvic fins (pair)
 Pectoral fins (pair)
 Anal fins (pair)
 Gill covers, or operculum (pair)

Aside from the red coloration, most of the jikin's body are white.

Jikin may also be called 'rokurin.Availability
Jikins are rarely found outside Japan, and are more expensive than the fairly common wakin.

History
The jikin was bred from the wakin during the Muromachi era. The tail spread apart and the body became slightly shorter. There was an old inscription regarding the creation of the pattern of this goldfish (by adding plum oil, or removing the scales with a small spatula), now refers to as the points of red.

Other breeds
Jikins are rarely crossbred. The jikin breeds are:
 
 The , also called the anemonefish goldfish, is an exquisite breed of goldfish only located in Japan. Its origins are less known due to its circumstances being unrecognized, but it is assumed to be a cross with a Bristol shubunkin and the Jikin. The name suggests the red body with white perpendicular stripes creates a clownfish-looking kind of fashion. Like jikins, artificial pattering is also used in kumanomi for stripes.
 Tokai Nishiki is a rare breed, bred by crossing a jikin with a choubi (butterfly telescope). The result is a long flowing body with long broad fins, and either an X-shaped or butterfly-shaped tail.
 Aurora is a rare breed of goldfish from Japan mixed by both a jikin and a bristol shubunkin. Although both hybrid goldfish breeds are originated by the same varieties, accordingly, while kumanomi is a single tailed, aurora is a double tailed.
 Sanshu Nishiki is a goldfish crossed by a ranchu and a jikin.
  Yanishiki' is a Japanese goldfish originated by crossbreeding jikin and bristol shubunkin. It is confusingly compared with aurora, only a least known difference are the caudal fin angle and shape.

References

External links

Goldfish breeds